Super Bowl XLV was an American football game between the American Football Conference (AFC) champion Pittsburgh Steelers and the National Football Conference (NFC) champion Green Bay Packers to decide the National Football League (NFL) champion for the 2010 season. The Packers defeated the Steelers by the score of 31–25. The game was played on February 6, 2011, at Cowboys Stadium in Arlington, Texas, the first time the Super Bowl was played in the Dallas–Fort Worth area.

Unlike most other Super Bowls, this game featured two title-abundant franchises: coming into the game, the Packers held the most NFL championships with 12 (9 league championships prior to the Super Bowl era and 3 Super Bowl championships), while the Steelers held the most Super Bowl championships with 6. The Packers entered their fifth Super Bowl in team history, and became the first 6-seed team in the NFC to compete in the Super Bowl, after posting a 10–6 regular season record. The Steelers finished the regular season with a 12–4 record, and advanced to an, at the time, league-tying 8th Super Bowl appearance.

Super Bowl XLV was initially dominated by Green Bay, jumping to a 21–3 lead before Pittsburgh cut it down to 21–10 just before halftime. Then after the teams exchanged touchdowns, the Steelers cut their deficit to 28–25 midway through the fourth quarter with wide receiver Mike Wallace's 25-yard touchdown reception from quarterback Ben Roethlisberger and a two-point conversion. But the Packers answered with Mason Crosby's 23-yard field goal with 2:07 remaining, and then prevented the Steelers from scoring on their final drive of the game. Packers quarterback Aaron Rodgers was named Super Bowl MVP, completing 24 of 39 passes for 304 yards, three touchdowns, and no interceptions. 

The broadcast of Super Bowl XLV on Fox averaged about 111 million viewers, breaking the record for the most-watched program in American television history. The game's attendance was 103,219, just short of the Super Bowl record 103,985 set in Super Bowl XIV at the Rose Bowl in Pasadena, California. The halftime show featured the American hip hop group The Black Eyed Peas, with additional performances by Usher and Slash.

Prior to Super Bowl LV, it was the last time that a wild-card team made or won the Super Bowl. This is also the last time either of the teams have made the Super Bowl, despite appearing in a combined five conference championships since then.

Background

Host selection process

Three NFL cities presented bids for the game:
In January 2007, Super Bowl VI MVP Roger Staubach was named chairman of the North Texas Super Bowl Bid Committee, heading the Metroplex's bid effort. The bid gathered the support of the cities of Arlington and Dallas.
On January 31, 2007, the city of Indianapolis, led by Colts owner Jim Irsay and Indianapolis Mayor Bart Peterson, officially announced details about their intentions to bid for Super Bowl XLV. The site would have been Lucas Oil Stadium, which opened in 2008. They were eventually awarded Super Bowl XLVI.
On February 21, 2007, the Glendale City Council came to a consensus to prepare a bid to host Super Bowl XLV. University of Phoenix Stadium was already scheduled to host Super Bowl XLII in 2008.

NFL owners voted to select the North Texas site on May 22, 2007. It marked the first Super Bowl in the Dallas–Fort Worth area after numerous unsuccessful bids in the 1960s-1970s.

Teams

Pittsburgh Steelers

The Pittsburgh Steelers finished the 2010 season with a 12–4 record.  They earned the AFC North division title, and the second seed in the AFC and advanced to their 8th Super Bowl, tying the Dallas Cowboys' record of most Super Bowl appearances.

After missing the first four games of the year on suspension for violating the NFL's personal conduct policy (during which the Steelers went 3–1), quarterback Ben Roethlisberger returned for his seventh season as the Steelers starting quarterback,  finishing the season with 3,200 yards and 17 touchdowns, with just five interceptions, for a 97 passer rating.  He also rushed for 176 yards and two touchdowns.  The team's top receiver was Mike Wallace who caught 60 passes for 1,257 yards and 10 touchdowns, giving him a 21 yards per catch average.  Other reliable options included 13-year veteran Hines Ward (59 receptions for 755 yards and 5 touchdowns), the Steelers all-time leading receiver, and tight end Heath Miller who caught 42 passes for 512 yards.  Halfback Rashard Mendenhall was the team's leading rusher, gaining 1,273 yards and 13 touchdowns while also catching 23 passes.  The line was led by rookie center Maurkice Pouncey, the Steelers only Pro Bowl selection on offense.  However, Pouncey was injured in the AFC championship game and would be inactive for Super Bowl XLV.

The Steelers had one of the league's top defenses, leading the NFL in sacks (48), and fewest points (14.5) and rushing yards (62.8) allowed per game, while ranking second in fewest total yards (276.8).  The line was anchored by Pro Bowl end Brett Keisel.  The Steelers also had four excellent linebackers:  LaMarr Woodley, James Harrison, James Farrior, and Lawrence Timmons.  For the third consecutive year, Woodley and Harrison each recorded at least 10 sacks.  Woodley also forced three fumbles and Harrison forced six.  Farrior had 109 total tackles and six sacks.  Timmons led the team with 135 total tackles, while also recording three sacks and two interceptions.  The secondary was led by pro bowl safety Troy Polamalu, who won the NFL Defensive Player of the Year Award, tying his career-best seven interceptions and returning them for 101 yards and a touchdown.

Coach Mike Tomlin, already the youngest coach to ever win a Super Bowl, became the youngest coach ever to make it to the Super Bowl twice at age 38. The Pittsburgh Steelers had also accomplished going to the Super Bowl in five different decades; and, in every decade since the post AFL-NFL merger. 1970s: 1975, 1976, and 1979. 1980s: 1980. 1990s: 1996. 2000s: 2006 and 2009. 2010s: 2011.

Green Bay Packers

The Green Bay Packers finished the season with a 10–6 record and became the first sixth-seeded team in the NFC to compete in the Super Bowl. They are only the second sixth-seeded team to reach the Super Bowl, with the only other number 6 seed to accomplish this feat, coincidentally, being the Pittsburgh Steelers, who won Super Bowl XL following the 2005 season. Green Bay also joined the 2005 Steelers as the only teams ever to defeat the top three seeded teams on the road in the playoffs. In order to secure their fifth Super Bowl bid they defeated their longtime rivals, the Chicago Bears, in the NFC Championship Game at Soldier Field.

The offense was led by quarterback Aaron Rodgers, who was in his third year as a starter after taking over for the team's all-time leading passer Brett Favre.  Rodgers finished the season completing 65.7% of his passes for 3,922 yards and 28 touchdowns, with only eleven interceptions, giving him his second consecutive season with a triple digit passer rating (101.2).  He was also a good rusher, adding 356 yards and 4 touchdowns on the ground.  His top target was pro bowl receiver Greg Jennings, who caught 76 passes for 1,265 yards and 12 touchdowns, giving him a 16.6 yards per catch average while also ranking him fourth in the NFL in yards and second in touchdown catches. Other reliable targets included receivers James Jones (50 receptions, 676 yards, 5 touchdowns), Donald Driver (51 receptions, 565 yards, 4 touchdowns), and Jordy Nelson (45 receptions, 582 yards, 496 kick return yards). The Packers lost star tight end Jermichael Finley  (21 receptions 301 yards, 1 touchdown) to injury in week five who was their leading receiver at the time. The Packers ground game was crippled by injuries, especially the Week 1 loss of Ryan Grant, who had rushed for over 1,200 yards in each of the last two seasons. In his absence, the team relied prominently on Brandon Jackson, who rushed for 703 yards and caught 43 passes for 342, and fullback John Kuhn, who added 281 yards on the ground. The team's offensive line was anchored by pro bowl tackle Chad Clifton, an 11-year veteran.

The Packers defense ranked second in the league in fewest points allowed per game (15).  The line was led by Cullen Jenkins, who recorded seven sacks in just eleven games, and 338-pound defensive tackle B. J. Raji, who had 6.5.  The linebackers were led by pro bowler Clay Matthews and A. J. Hawk.  Matthews ranked fourth in the NFL with 13.5 sacks, while Hawk led the team in combined tackles (111) and intercepted three passes.  Three of the Packers starters in the secondary had made the pro bowl. Tramon Williams led the team with a career-high 6 interceptions, while adding 326 punt return yards.  Other pro bowl selections included safety Nick Collins (4 interceptions and 70 combined tackles) and hard hitting 13-year veteran cornerback Charles Woodson, who recorded 92 total tackles and forced five fumbles, while also intercepting two passes.

The Packers entered the Super Bowl never having trailed by more than 7 points at any point during the season—a feat that had never been accomplished during a complete season in the Super Bowl era. The last team to complete a season with this distinction was the Detroit Lions in 1962.  In the Super Bowl game itself, the Packers never trailed.

Of note, this was Green Bay's first Super Bowl against an AFC team that was not one of the "Original 8" American Football League franchises. The Packers had played Kansas City, Oakland, New England, and Denver in their four previous Super Bowl match-ups, defeating the Chiefs, Raiders and Patriots and splitting two Super Bowls with the Broncos. The Steelers, like the Packers, predated the AFL's launch, having begun play in 1933 (12 years after the Packers joined the NFL after two years as an independent team), and moved to the AFC in 1970 as a result of the AFL–NFL merger to even out the two conferences.

Playoffs

The Steelers advanced to the Super Bowl with two close wins in the playoffs. After a first-round bye, the Steelers defeated their division rival, the number 5 seeded Baltimore Ravens 31–24, with Ben Roethlisberger's 58-yard completion to Antonio Brown on third down and 19 setting up Rashard Mendenhall's game winning 2-yard touchdown run with 1:33 left in the game. Roethlisberger finished with 226 passing yards and two touchdowns, while the defense forced three turnovers and sacked Ravens quarterback Joe Flacco five times, three by James Harrison.

Then the Steelers defeated the number 6 seeded New York Jets 24–19 in the AFC Championship Game. The Steelers seemed to be in complete control at first, taking a 24–0 lead in the first half. Jets quarterback Mark Sanchez rallied his team back, cutting the score to 24–10 going into the fourth quarter. The Jets then drove to the Steelers 2-yard line on a 17-play drive, but the Steelers defense made a key stand, keeping them out of the end zone on four consecutive plays near the goal-line to force a turnover. The Jets subsequently forced a safety and scored a touchdown with just over three minutes left, but Roethlisberger's 14-yard completions to Brown and Heath Miller allowed the Steelers to hang onto the ball until time expired. Mendenhall finished with 121 rushing yards and a touchdown, along with 2 catches for 32 yards.

The Packers started off their postseason with a 21–16 win over the number 3 seeded Philadelphia Eagles after Tramon Williams intercepted a pass from Michael Vick in the end zone with less than a minute left to play. Aaron Rodgers threw for 180 yards and three touchdowns while James Starks, who only rushed for 101 yards during the season, rushed for 123 yards in the game.

The Packers then went to Atlanta, where the top-seeded 13–3 Atlanta Falcons were waiting. Although the Falcons took advantage of an early turnover and a kick return touchdown to build a 14–7 lead, the Packers quickly buried the Falcons with 35 straight points. By the end of the first half, the Packers held a 28–14 lead, and went on to win comfortably, 48–21.  Rodgers was nearly perfect, completing 31 of 36 passes for 366 yards and three touchdowns, while adding another score on the ground. Jordy Nelson and James Jones both had touchdown catches, while John Kuhn added scores by air and ground and Tramon Williams returned one of his two interceptions 70 yards for a touchdown. The Packers' special teams unit never had to punt the ball, while Mason Crosby contributed two field goals.

The Packers next faced their rival, the number 2 Chicago Bears in the NFC Championship Game, defeating them 21–14. This time Rodgers had a rougher day than his previous two games, throwing no touchdown passes and being intercepted twice. But he still threw for 244 yards and scored a 1-yard touchdown run, while Starks added 74 rushing yards, including a touchdown run in the second quarter.  Meanwhile, the Packers' defense knocked Bears quarterback Jay Cutler out of the game and intercepted three passes, one of which was returned 18 yards for a touchdown by B. J. Raji. The other two were made by rookie Sam Shields, who recorded his second interception near his own end zone with 37 seconds left to put the game away.

Super Bowl pregame notes

Both teams are known to have sizable fanbases that often travel to away games, largely due to the home games themselves having decades-long waiting lists. In August 2008, ESPN.com ranked the two teams tied as having the best fans in the NFL. ESPN's own John Clayton, a Pittsburgh native, broke the tie in favor of the Steelers.

As the Packers were the designated home team in the annual rotation between AFC and NFC teams, the team elected to wear their green jerseys. Although both teams are known to wear their colored jerseys at home and have rarely worn white at home (the Packers wore white at home for two games in 1989), the Packers decision contrasted with the Steelers decision as the home team in Super Bowl XL to wear white jerseys. Both the 2005 Steelers and 2010 Packers were number 6 seeded teams when they reached the Super Bowl, forcing them to play all of their postseason games on the road and wearing their respective white jerseys in those games.

The retractable roof at Cowboys Stadium was closed for the game.

A severe winter storm blanketed the Dallas–Fort Worth area in hard ice and snow the week before the game, threatening to disrupt game preparations.  Snow fell from the roof of Cowboys Stadium's East end on February 4, injuring six people.  Over 3,000 tickets were sold to watch the game in the stadium's East Plaza, which experienced the falling ice tragedy earlier in the week.  However, the snow had melted by game time and fans who paid $200 per ticket were allowed to watch the game outside Cowboys Stadium, in the open air, as the weather turned from sleet to sun.

Since the Steelers and Packers were two of the six teams that did not have cheerleaders during the 2010 NFL season (the others being the Chicago Bears, Detroit Lions, Cleveland Browns, and New York Giants), this marked the first Super Bowl without cheerleaders.

Packers lineman, Bryan Bulaga, became the youngest player to start in a Super Bowl, at the age of 21 years and 322 days old. Steelers center Maurkice Pouncey would have been the youngest player (21 years, 197 days), but he could not play because of a high ankle sprain.

Possible presidential appearance
During a press conference on January 19, 2011, President Obama (a longtime Chicago Bears fan) said he would attend Super Bowl XLV if Chicago defeated Green Bay, saying "If Chicago wins, I’m going no doubt". Chicago ended up losing the NFC Championship game a few days later on January 23 to Green Bay 21–14. In a post-game locker-room speech by Green Bay Packers corner Charles Woodson poked fun at the President's comment saying "The President don't want to come watch us at the Super Bowl, guess what? We'll go see him" (implying that Green Bay would win the Super Bowl and visit the White House as the winning team usually does each year; a statement that would come true). Woodson then broke the Packers meeting with a team cheer of "White House!". On January 26 President Obama visited Green Bay and was greeted by Mayor Jim Schmitt and Wisconsin Governor Scott Walker who presented the President with two Green Bay Packers Jerseys.  The first had Obama's name on the back with the number 1 and the second was an autographed Charles Woodson jersey with the message "See you at the White House. Go Packers!" written on the back by Woodson.

On August 12, 2011, Woodson's promise came true and Packers visited the White House and met with President Obama.  Their visit was delayed because of the NFL lockout and took place a day before the Packers first preseason game against the Cleveland Browns. President Obama was presented with a Packers jersey with the number 1 and the words Commander-In-Chief on the back. He was also presented with a stock share of the Packers organization, thus making him a part owner of the Packers. When Obama jokingly asked if this meant he could trade Aaron Rodgers to the Bears, Woodson responded that Obama was just "a minority owner."

Obama, who is also a Steelers fan and considers the team to be his second-favorite after the Bears, openly supported the Steelers two years earlier in Super Bowl XLIII after the Rooney family helped with his campaigning work and later appointed Steelers chairman Dan Rooney, an ethnic Irish Catholic, the U.S. Ambassador to Ireland. He did not attend the game; instead, he hosted a 100-person Super Bowl party at the White House. Attendees included his family, elected leaders from Pennsylvania and Wisconsin, DNC member Andres Lopez of Puerto Rico, Buffalo, New York mayor Byron Brown, Buffalo deputy mayor Steve Casey, Newark, New Jersey mayor Cory Booker, Jennifer Lopez and her husband Marc Anthony, both actors/singers, ESPN columnist Michael Wilbon, and Tony Kornheiser.

Although the sitting president did not attend the game, former president and former Texas governor George W. Bush was present, along with his wife Laura and former Secretary of State Condoleezza Rice.

Local commemoration
From June 15, 2010, through February 6, 2011, the 30-mile section of Interstate 30 between Dallas and Fort Worth along which Cowboys Stadium is situated had been temporarily designated as the "Tom Landry Super Bowl Highway" in commemoration of Super Bowl XLV.  The former Dallas–Fort Worth Turnpike is normally known as the "Tom Landry Highway" in honor of former Dallas Cowboys coach Tom Landry.

Logo
While past Super Bowl games used their own unique logo designs that changed yearly and featured imagery which reflected the host city, Super Bowl XLV introduced a new standardized, silver-colored emblem, featuring an image of the Vince Lombardi Trophy sitting atop the traditional Roman numerals used to denote each edition, with a stylized image of the host stadium shown in the background. It was introduced as part of a new, standardized branding scheme for the NFL's postseason games, which also saw the redesign of the conference championship trophies.

The only changes made to the logo for future games, until Super Bowl 50, was to change the number and the stadium depicted. Super Bowl 50 deviated slightly from the standard design to emphasize the game's "golden anniversary", featuring the number "50" in large gold numbering on each side of the trophy rather than below it in Roman numerals. This modified layout, but with Roman numerals, no stadium, and different accent colors or, later, designs within the numerals, has been used for subsequent Super Bowl games.

Broadcasting

Television

United States
Fox Sports televised the game in the United States, with Joe Buck as the play-by-play announcer and Troy Aikman, himself a three-time Super Bowl winner as a Dallas Cowboys quarterback, as the color analyst. Mike Pereira joined Buck and Aikman in the broadcast booth to comment on instant replay reviews, while Pam Oliver and Chris Myers served as sideline reporters. The pre-game show featured the Fox NFL Sunday crew of host Curt Menefee and a group of analysts with extensive Super Bowl experiences of their own: Terry Bradshaw (4 time Super Bowl-winning quarterback with the Pittsburgh Steelers), Howie Long (one-time Super Bowl winning defensive end with the then-Los Angeles Raiders), Michael Strahan (one-time Super Bowl winning defensive end with the New York Giants) and Jimmy Johnson (two-time Super Bowl winning head coach with the Dallas Cowboys). They were joined by a variety of other commentators.

Five days prior to the game, Immigration and Customs Enforcement, along with the United States Attorney for the Southern District of New York, seized and shut down several websites that had provided access to pirated Internet television feeds of NFL games.

With an average US audience of 111 million viewers, this was the most-watched Super Bowl as well as the most-watched program of any kind in American television history, beating the previous record of 106.5 million viewers for Super Bowl XLIV. However, Super Bowl XVI still holds the record for the highest rated Super Bowl in history with a 49.1 national rating and a 73 share. An estimated 162.9 million total viewers watched all or part of the game. The game drew a national household Nielsen rating of 46.0 and a 69 share. It drew a 59.7 local rating in both Milwaukee (WITI) and Pittsburgh (WPGH), the second-highest local rating for a Super Bowl after the 63.0 that Super Bowl XX drew in Chicago. In the host market of Dallas–Fort Worth (KDFW), the game drew a 53.7 rating.

The Steelers also became the second team to appear on Super Bowls on all four major networks, after the Denver Broncos. The Steelers appeared previously on four NBC-aired Super Bowls (IX, XIII, XXX, XLIII), two CBS-aired Super Bowls (X, XIV), and one ABC-aired Super Bowl (XL).

Fox's lead-out program was an episode of Glee titled "The Sue Sylvester Shuffle".

Commercials
By September 15, 2010, Fox had sold 90% of all available slots; all slots were completely sold out by October. The price of an advertisement began at US$3 million. Pepsi-Cola returned after a one-year retreat with three ads for their Pepsi Max drink, which has been named as the official soft drink of the NFL. Pepsi's Frito-Lay brand also advertised Doritos. Both brands had their advertisements created by web users as part of the annual USA Today Super Bowl Ad Meter contest, which offers a prize of US $5 million. In addition, regular purchasers Anheuser-Busch InBev, GoDaddy.com, Coca-Cola, CareerBuilder.com, and E*TRADE purchased advertisements; InBev advertised Stella Artois imported beer for the first time in the Super Bowl in addition to its usual Budweiser and Bud Light advertisements. Hyundai, Mercedes-Benz, Volkswagen and Audi also advertised, as did General Motors, who returned for the first time since their bankruptcy with advertisements for the Chevrolet Cruze, Camaro, Silverado and Volt. Chrysler purchased a 2-minute-long advertisement for its Chrysler 200 featuring Eminem.

Advertisements for 15 films were shown during the Pre-Game, Game, and Post-Game.

International telecasts
NFL International provided television coverage for viewers outside of North America, with Bob Papa and Joe Theismann calling the English language feed. The game was shown live on the following channels:
Asia: All Sports Network.
: DragonTV, G-Sports, GDTV Sports, BTV Sports, CNTV 5+ (online), Sina TV (online), QQLive (online), .
: One HD & Network Ten. In addition it was also broadcast live on ESPN Australia.
: CTV in English (using the FOX feed) and RDS in French. As in past years, CTV exercised its simultaneous substitution rights over American stations carrying the game on Canadian cable and satellite providers.
: ESPN America, in addition to the following local broadcasters:
: Puls 4.
: Prime Sport, BeTV.
: TV3+/TV3+ HD.
:  Nelonen Pro 1.
: W9 (audience: 300,000, share: 8.6%).
: ARD (audience: 970,000), Sport1+.
 and : Sport 1.
 Stöð2Sport
: La7, Dahlia TV.
: Sport 5.
: NRK (With the FOX feed and reactions from experts in studio during commercial breaks. The Bridgestone Halftime Show was also broadcast.)
: Polsat Sport.
: SportTV.
: NTV Plus.
: Šport TV 1.
: Canal+.
: TV10.
: SSF.
 and : BBC One (audience: 1.01m), BBC One HD, Sky Sports and Sky Sports HD.
Latin America: ESPN Latin America and Fox Sports Latin America.
: BandSports, Band and ESPN Brasil.
: Azteca 7 and Canal 5.
: ESPN.

Radio
Westwood One broadcast Super Bowl XLV across the United States and Canada, with play-by-play announcer Kevin Harlan (calling his first Super Bowl for the network) and color analyst Boomer Esiason. Univision Radio carried a Spanish language feed for its stations throughout the US. The flagship stations for each team also carried the game with their respective local announcers:
The Packers Radio Network via WTAQ, WTAQ-FM and WIXX in Green Bay and WTMJ in Milwaukee, with Wayne Larrivee and Larry McCarren announcing.
The Pittsburgh Steelers Radio Network via WDVE and WBGG in Pittsburgh, with Bill Hillgrove and Tunch Ilkin announcing.

In the United Kingdom, BBC Radio 5 Live carried radio coverage with Darren Fletcher and Greg Brady announcing.

Sirius XM Satellite Radio carried 14 feeds in ten languages to Sirius subscribers, as well as to XM subscribers with the "Best of Sirius" package. In addition to the Westwood One and local team broadcasts, Sirius carried the following international feeds:

: Eldorado ESPN (Portuguese)
: SMG (Chinese)
: Viasat Sport (Danish)
: W9 (French)
: ARD (German)
: Chello (Hungarian)
: NHK (Japanese)
: TV Azteca (Spanish)
: Prime Sport (Dutch)
: NTV Plus (Russian)
: Canal+ Spain (Spanish)
: BBC Radio 5 Live (English)

FieldPass, the subscription Internet radio service provided by the league at NFL.com, also carried most of these feeds. Due to contractual restrictions, only Sirius XM and FieldPass were permitted to carry the local team broadcasts along with WTAQ, WIXX, WTMJ, WDVE and WBGG, with the teams' other network radio affiliates instead airing the Westwood One feed.

Attendance
Cowboys Stadium installed 15,000 temporary seats and utilized its standing room to increase its capacity to over 105,000 fans.  If the stadium had been filled to capacity (its record for an NFL game is 105,121 spectators), it would have set a record for Super Bowl attendance, breaking the previous record of 103,985 fans for Super Bowl XIV in the Rose Bowl; however the actual attendance of 103,219 fell 766 fans short. League officials had indicated that they would also count spectators watching the game on large television screens from outside the stadium in the tally, which generally is not allowed in official attendance counts. However, Super Bowl XLV was the first Super Bowl game to break the 100,000 threshold in attendance since Super Bowl XXI in 1987.

Due to numerous delays, including damage sustained from an ice storm, 1,250 temporary seats weren't ready in time for the game. According to a police officer standing near the affected area, the seats hadn't been installed in time for the fire marshal to inspect them. The NFL scrambled almost until kickoff to find replacement seats. Eventually, 850 fans in four sections were relocated, while 400 fans in two sections were given a refund equivalent to three times the face value of their ticket. The latter set of fans were later offered the chance to watch the game on monitors in the North Field Club behind the Steelers bench, but would still get the triple refund. Some of these fans were still upset, since they had spent thousands on airfare and hotels. NFL spokesman Brian McCarthy said that when the league decided to relocate the 850 fans, it lost any shot of setting the attendance record.

The NFL subsequently offered affected fans a ticket to the next Super Bowl in addition to the refund. It also offered fans the option of a ticket to any future Super Bowl, along with round-trip airfare and hotel accommodations. However, this wasn't enough to mollify several fans, who on February 9 filed a $5 million class-action lawsuit against the NFL, the Cowboys and Jones. In addition to Steelers and Packers fans left without seats, the suit includes Cowboys fans who paid $100,000 for personal seat licenses, only to have to watch the Super Bowl in metal folding chairs without a view of the stadium's giant video replay board. The NFL at first offered $2,400 to fans who did not receive a replacement seat, but later offered tickets to a future Super Bowl with airfare and hotels included.

Not all of the fans accepted the NFL's settlement offer, so the case went to trial. The final outcome of the lawsuit was a finding for the plaintiffs against the NFL in the matter of breach of contract, and not liable for fraudulent inducement. The Cowboys and Jerry Jones were dismissed as parties to the lawsuit since the plaintiffs' contracts were solely with the NFL. The plaintiffs were awarded between $5,600 and $22,000 depending on the value of their tickets.

Entertainment and other ceremonies

Pregame
Keith Urban and Maroon 5 performed during the pregame. The Texas Christian University Horned Frog Marching Band also performed during the pregame show. 22-year-old Candice Villesca of Lewisville, Texas performed the national anthem and "America the Beautiful" in American Sign Language.  Lea Michele performed "America the Beautiful" supported by the Air Force Tops in Blue. Pop singer Christina Aguilera sang the national anthem, but performed the wrong lyrics for the fourth line of the song, later issuing an apology.

The coin toss ceremony was the first to commemorate two anniversaries—the 25th anniversary of Super Bowl XX and 15th of Super Bowl XXX, which marked the Dallas Cowboys' most recent Super Bowl championship.  In honor of those occasions, Super Bowl XX MVP Richard Dent and former Dallas Cowboys defensive back Deion Sanders, both of whom were inducted into the Pro Football Hall of Fame in 2011, joined the ceremonies.  They were joined by fellow Pro Football Hall of Fame inductees and past Super Bowl participants Marshall Faulk, Chris Hanburger and Shannon Sharpe.

Halftime

The Black Eyed Peas performed a medley of their greatest hits: "I Gotta Feeling", "Boom Boom Pow", "Pump It", "The Time (Dirty Bit)", "Let's Get It Started", and "Where Is the Love?" Slash made a guest appearance, performing "Sweet Child o' Mine" with Fergie, while Usher made an appearance to perform his song "OMG" with will.i.am. The show also displayed a long list of other performers, including Prairie View A&M University's "Marching Storm" Band. Country music was originally in the planning until the Black Eyed Peas agreed to perform. This halftime show was intended to bring youth back into the Super Bowl halftime show as legacy artists were book for the past halftime shows following the incident during the Super Bowl XXXVIII halftime show where Justin Timberlake exposed Janet Jackson's breast on live television.

In Jermaine Jackson's book You Are Not Alone: Through a Brother's Eyes, it reveals that after the This Is It tour, Michael Jackson wanted to perform in the Super Bowl one last time, which unfortunately never came to pass because of the singer's sudden death in 2009.

Game summary

First half
After the first three drives of the game ended with punts, Green Bay opened up the scoring with Aaron Rodgers's 29-yard touchdown pass to wide receiver Jordy Nelson, who managed to pull slightly ahead of cornerback William Gay enough to make a leaping catch and fall into the end zone. Then on the first play after the ensuing kickoff, quarterback Ben Roethlisberger was hit by Howard Green as he threw a pass, causing the ball to go well short of his intended target near the left sideline where it was intercepted by Nick Collins and returned 37 yards for a touchdown, giving Green Bay a 14–0 lead. This score continued the unbeaten streak of Super Bowl victories recorded by teams scoring on an interception run-back, improving to 11–0 in such games. It was also the third consecutive Super Bowl with an interception return for a touchdown, as well as the eighth such score in the last ten Super Bowls.  The Packers also tied the Miami Dolphins' record which still stands for the largest Super Bowl lead (14 points) at the end of the first quarter, set in Super Bowl VIII against the Minnesota Vikings and later tied by the Oakland Raiders against the Philadelphia Eagles in Super Bowl XV.

This time Pittsburgh managed to respond, driving 49 yards in 13 plays including Roethlisberger's 18-yard run on 3rd down and 9. Shaun Suisham finished the drive with a 33-yard field goal to cut the score to 14–3. Then after forcing a punt, the Steelers drove to midfield, but turned the ball over again when Roethlisberger's pass was intercepted by defensive back Jarrett Bush at the 47. After the interception, Rodgers led the Packers to another score, completing two passes for 20 yards before James Starks's 12-yard run moved the ball to the 21-yard line. On the next play, Green Bay increased their lead to 21–3 with Rodgers' 21-yard touchdown pass to Greg Jennings. Taking the ball back with 2:24 left in the second quarter, Roethlisberger made a 37-yard completion to Antwaan Randle El on their first play. After that, receiver Hines Ward caught three passes for 39 yards on the drive, the last one an 8-yard touchdown catch with 37 seconds left in the half, making the score 21–10 at halftime.  This was the fourth time in their four 2011 postseason games that the Packers finished the first half with a lead of at least 11 points. The first half had taken a heavy toll on both teams. The Steelers lost wide receiver Emmanuel Sanders to injury, while the Packers lost receiver Donald Driver along with defensive backs Charles Woodson and Sam Shields. Shields would be the only player among them who would return.

Second half

Pittsburgh's defense forced Green Bay to punt on the first drive of the second half, and got the ball at midfield after a face-mask call on Tom Crabtree while tackling Antonio Brown on the punt return. The offense then scored in five plays (all runs). First, Rashard Mendenhall broke free along with right sideline for a 17-yard run, then Isaac Redman rushed for 3 yards, and Roethlisberger ran for 6, bringing up third down and 1. On the next play, Redman tried to run up the middle, but was held up at the line, so he backed away and ran to the outside for a 16-yard gain to the 8-yard line. Then Mendenhall scored an 8-yard touchdown run on the next play, making the score 21–17.  After forcing a punt, Pittsburgh mounted a drive to the Packers 29-yard line, but Green Bay's defense made a stand. First Roethlisberger's pass was batted down behind the line by linebacker Clay Matthews, then Roethlisberger tried a screen pass to tight end Heath Miller, but Desmond Bishop tackled him for a 3-yard loss. Then on third down Frank Zombo sacked Roethlisberger on the 34, and Suisham's ensuing 52-yard field goal attempt sailed wide left.

On the first play of the fourth quarter, the Steelers lost their third turnover of the game when Mendenhall fumbled the ball while being tackled behind the line by Matthews and Ryan Pickett. Bishop recovered the ball and returned it 7 yards to the Packers 45. Five plays later on third down and 10, Rodgers completed a 38-yard pass to Nelson at the Steelers 2-yard line. Pittsburgh linebacker LaMarr Woodley sacked Rodgers for a 6-yard loss on the next play, but Rodgers threw an 8-yard touchdown pass to Jennings after that, increasing the Packers lead to 28–17. Roethlisberger led the Steelers right back with 6 of 7 completions.  After a 9-yard pass to tight end Matt Spaeth, he threw three completions to receiver Mike Wallace for 27 yards to the Green Bay 40-yard line. Then after a 15-yard completion to Ward, he finished the drive with a 25-yard touchdown pass to Wallace. On the two-point conversion play, Roethlisberger faked a hand-off to Mendenhall and ran up to the line before pitching the ball to Randle El, who scored on an outside sweep, cutting the Steelers deficit to 3 points at 28–25.

Green Bay took the ball back with just over 7 minutes left, and found themselves facing third down and 10 after two plays, but Rodgers kept the drive going with a 31-yard completion to Jennings over the middle. Starks then ran 14 yards to the Steelers 30. Two plays later, James Jones caught a 21-yard pass at the 8. The Steelers defense kept Green Bay out of the end zone, forcing the Packers to settle for a 23-yard field goal by Mason Crosby that gave Green Bay a 31–25 lead with 2:07 left in regulation.

Pittsburgh got the ball back on their own 13-yard line following a penalty on the kickoff. On their first play, Roethlisberger completed a 15-yard pass to Miller. But after a 5-yard reception by Ward, his next three passes were incomplete, turning the ball over and allowing the Packers to run out the rest of the clock. In a nod to Green Bay's defensive dominance, Pittsburgh did not take the lead at any time in the entire game.

Box score

Statistical overview
The Packers joined the New York Giants as the only teams to win Super Bowls in 3 different decades (1966, 1967, 1996, and 2010).

Nelson was the top receiver of the game with 9 receptions for 140 yards (both career highs) and a touchdown, while also gaining 19 more yards on a kick return, all despite 3 dropped passes. Jennings added 64 yards and 2 touchdowns. Roethlisberger completed 25 of 40 passes for 263 yards and two touchdowns, with 2 interceptions, and ran for 31 yards. His top target was Wallace, who caught 9 passes for 89 yards and a score. Mendenhall was the top rusher of the game with 64 yards and a touchdown.

Final statistics
Sources: NFL.com Super Bowl XLV, Super Bowl XLV Play Finder GB, Super Bowl XLV Play Finder Pit

Statistical comparison

Individual statistics

1Completions/attempts
2Carries
3Long gain
4Receptions
5Times targeted

Starting lineups
Source:

Officials
Referee – Walt Anderson
Umpire – Chad Brown
Head Linesman – Kent Payne
Line Judge – John Hussey
Field Judge – Doug Rosenbaum
Side Judge – Mike Weatherford
Back Judge – Scott Helverson
Alternate Referee – Jerome Boger
Alternate Umpire – Rich Hall
Alternate Flank – Tom Symonette
Alternate Deep – Gary Cavaletto
Alternate Back Judge – Dino Paganelli

References

External links
 
Official Super Bowl website
Super Bowl XLV at ESPN
Host committee website
Super Bowl XLV at NFL.com

2010 National Football League season
2011 in American football
2011 in American television
2011 in sports in Texas
21st century in Arlington, Texas
Green Bay Packers postseason
Pittsburgh Steelers postseason
American football in the Dallas–Fort Worth metroplex
Super Bowl 045
February 2011 sports events in the United States
Sports competitions in Arlington, Texas